Samira Suleman (born August 16, 1991) is a Ghanaian international footballer who plays as a forward in Iceland for Víkingur Ólafsvík.

Club career

Iceland
Suleman came to Víkingur Ólafsvík in 2015 and made 10 appearances during the 2015 season.

International career 
She scored in a 2–0 win against Ethiopia in a 2014 African Women's Championship qualification match. She was on the Ghana squad for the 2014 African Women's Championship. She scored in Ghana's 1–0 win over Ivory Coast in the semifinals of the 2015 African Games. In April 2016 she scored Brace against Tunisia which helped the Black Queens qualify for the 2016 African Women Championship in Cameroon. She was Nominated by the Sports Writers Association of Ghana in 2016.

International goals

Ambassadorial Role 

On March 14, 2018, Suleman was appointed as an ambassador by World Vision International to aid in the eradication of Early Child Marriage in the Northern Region and the rest of Northern Ghana.

References

External links
 

1991 births
Living people
Women's association football forwards
Ghanaian women's footballers
Robert Morris University Illinois alumni
Ghanaian expatriate footballers
African Games gold medalists for Ghana
African Games medalists in football
Competitors at the 2015 African Games
Ghanaian expatriate women's footballers
Ghana women's international footballers
Ghana Women's Premier League players